Giuseppe Morosi (born February 12, 1942 in Agliana) is a retired Italian professional football player.

References

1942 births
Living people
Italian footballers
Serie A players
Inter Milan players
A.C. Reggiana 1919 players
Ravenna F.C. players
U.S. Salernitana 1919 players
S.S.D. Lucchese 1905 players
Association football defenders
A.S.D. Fanfulla players